Solomon "Sol" Mogal (September 25, 1911 - April 6, 1989) was an American bridge player from Croton-on-Hudson, New York. He was born in New York on September 25, 1911. In the late 1930s, he became president of a Manhattan-based importing business, Mitchell Mogal. He died in Manhattan on April 6, 1989. He was 77 years old.

Bridge accomplishments

Wins

 North American Bridge Championships (7)
 Wernher Open Pairs (1) 1947 
 Marcus Cup (1) 1951 
 Mitchell Board-a-Match Teams (3) 1947, 1948, 1954 
 Spingold (2) 1946, 1949

Runners-up

 North American Bridge Championships
 Reisinger (1) 1949 
 Spingold (1) 1952

Notes

1911 births
1989 deaths
American contract bridge players
People from Westchester County, New York